The Colgate Raiders represented Colgate University in ECAC women's ice hockey during the 2016–17 NCAA Division I women's ice hockey season.

Offseason

July 14:  The Class of 1965 Arena was completed, replacing the Starr Rink/Arena.

August 15:  Shae Labbe was named to Team Canada's Development Team.

Recruiting

Roster

2016-17 Raiders

Schedule

|-
!colspan=12 style="background:#862633;color:white;"| Regular Season

|-
!colspan=12 style="background:#862633;color:white;"| ECAC Tournament

Awards and honors

Jessie Eldridge, Forward, ECAC Third Team All-Star

References

Colgate
Colgate Raiders women's ice hockey seasons